Jialingpus is an ichnogenus of dinosaur, likely a theropod. Its footprints have been found in the Feitianshan Formation, a low-energy lake formation and the holotype is SCFP-24, which was found in Late Jurassic (Oxfordian)-aged Yuechi tracksite at Huanglong, China. Its footprints were found within the vicinity of those of the smaller theropod Minisauripus, meaning that it likely hunted Minisauripus.

See also

 List of dinosaur ichnogenera

References

Dinosaur trace fossils
Fossil taxa described in 1983